Giulia Domenichetti (born 29 April 1984) is an Italian former football midfielder and futsal player, both in the highest leagues in Italy. Before ending a three-year spell out of football in 2018, she mainly played for Sassari Torres in Italy's Serie A. She was a member of the Italian national team for nearly a decade, taking part in three European Championships.

Career
Aside from eleven seasons with Torres, where she won three Serie A winner's medals, she also played in Serie A with Calcio Chiasiellis A versatile midfielder, Domenichetti was a longstanding member of the Italy women's national football team with 90 caps. She is a veteran of Italy's 2005, 2009 and 2013 UEFA Women's Championship campaigns.

Coinciding with Torres' exclusion from Serie A for financial reasons, in 2015 she left association football for futsal. She signed with Città di Montesilvano, a Serie A Elite club based in Montesilvano, Italy. The club won the championship in 2015-2016 the season.

Torres played one more season in Serie A football, signing with Florentia San Gimignano S.S.D. for the 2018–19 season.

International career
Domenichetti made her senior debut for Italy on 13 April 2005, in a 1–0 home friendly win over Denmark. Included in the squad for UEFA Women's Euro 2005 in North West England, she played in all three games as Italy made a group stage exit.

At UEFA Women's Euro 2009 in Finland, Domenichetti played in all four games as the Italians reached the quarter-finals. Four years later, national coach Antonio Cabrini named Domenichetti in his selection for UEFA Women's Euro 2013 in Sweden.

Record

Club
Torres Calcio
 Serie A (3): 2009–10, 2010–11, 2012–13
 Coppa Italia (4): 2003–04, 2004–05, 2007–08, 2010–11
 Supercoppa Italiana (4): 2008–09, 2009–10, 2010–11, 2012–13
 Best performance in other competitions
 UEFA Champions League (Quarterfinals): 2004–05, 2009–10, 2012–13, 2013–14

National team
 Best performance
 UEFA Euro (quarterfinals): 2009, 2013

References

External links

Giulia Domenichetti at Football.it 

1984 births
Living people
Italian women's footballers
Italy women's international footballers
Sportspeople from Ancona
Serie A (women's football) players
Torres Calcio Femminile players
Women's association football midfielders
Florentia San Gimignano S.S.D. players
A.S.D. Calcio Chiasiellis players
Italian women's futsal players
Footballers from Marche